Miko Doyle (8 April 1911 – 29 September 1980) was an Irish sportsperson.  He played Gaelic football and hurling with his local club Austin Stacks and was a member of the Kerry senior inter-county team from 1929 until 1939.

He won five All Ireland medals with Kerry during his playing days, four of them by the age of 21. He was captain of the 1937 winning team. He also won three National Football League titles.

At the time Austin Stacks were one of the main teams in Kerry in both football and hurling and Doyle won County Championships with both, five in football and four in hurling. He was captain of the 1936 winning football team.

References
 
 

 

Dual players
Austin Stacks Gaelic footballers
Kerry inter-county Gaelic footballers
Austin Stacks hurlers
Munster inter-provincial Gaelic footballers
1911 births
1980 deaths